Stipagrostis obtusa is a perennial grass belonging to the grass family (Poaceae). It is a widespread species, being native to North Africa, Mauritania, Chad, Ethiopia, Southern Africa, Western Asia, the Arabian Peninsula and Pakistan.

References

Notes

Literature

Aristidoideae
Flora of North Africa
Flora of Mauritania
Flora of Chad
Flora of Ethiopia
Flora of Southern Africa
Flora of Western Asia
Flora of the Arabian Peninsula
Flora of Pakistan